Ibrahim Duro (born 26 April 1970) is a retired Bosnian-Herzegovinian footballer.

Club career
Duro played for NK Zagreb and NK Rijeka in the Croatian Prva HNL.

Played in the Israeli premier league between 1997-2001, and was one of the key players in 1998-1999 season, when Maccabi Haifa achieved one of its best European achievements.

International career
He made his debut in Bosnia and Herzegovina's first ever official international game, a November 1995 friendly match away against Albania, which remained his sole international appearance.

References

External links

1970 births
Living people
People from Konjic
Association football midfielders
Yugoslav footballers
Bosnia and Herzegovina footballers
Bosnia and Herzegovina international footballers
FK Sarajevo players
HNK Hajduk Split players
HNK Šibenik players
NK Zagreb players
Maccabi Haifa F.C. players
Hapoel Kfar Saba F.C. players
Maccabi Ahi Nazareth F.C. players
HNK Rijeka players
NK Croatia Sesvete players
Croatian Football League players
Israeli Premier League players
Liga Leumit players
First Football League (Croatia) players
Bosnia and Herzegovina expatriate footballers
Expatriate footballers in Croatia
Bosnia and Herzegovina expatriate sportspeople in Croatia
Expatriate footballers in Israel
Bosnia and Herzegovina expatriate sportspeople in Israel